Sir Hew (or Hugh) Dalrymple, 2nd Baronet, Lord Drummore (12 March 1712 – 24 November 1790) was a Scottish politician and MP.

He was the eldest son of Sir Robert Dalrymple, who died on 21 August 1734, predeceasing his father. Sir Hew thus inherited the baronetcy of his grandfather, Hew Dalrymple, Lord North Berwick, on the latter's death in 1737. His brother, John Dalrymple, later Hamilton, was also an MP.

He served on two occasions as MP for Haddington Burghs, between 1742 and 1747 and again between 1761 and 1768, and was also MP for Haddingtonshire between 1747 and 1761.

He was appointed King's Remembrancer in the Scottish Exchequer in 1768, holding the post to 1770.

He married twice; firstly Margaret, the daughter of London surgeon Peter Sainthill, with whom he had two sons and secondly Martha, the daughter of Charles Edwin of Lincoln's Inn. He was succeeded by his eldest son Hew, who later changed his name to Hamilton-Dalrymple.

Citations

References
Scots Peerage Vol. 8

1712 births
1790 deaths
Members of the Parliament of Great Britain for Scottish constituencies
British MPs 1741–1747
British MPs 1747–1754
British MPs 1754–1761
British MPs 1761–1768
Baronets in the Baronetage of Nova Scotia